Charles Dallan Maxvill (born February 18, 1939) is a retired shortstop, coach and general manager in Major League Baseball (MLB). During his career, Maxvill played, coached, or was an executive for four World Series winners and seven league champions.

Early life
A native of the St. Louis suburb of Granite City, Illinois, Maxvill played baseball in high school, then attended the McKelvey School of Engineering at Washington University in St. Louis where he earned a degree in electrical engineering. He signed his first professional baseball contract in 1960 with the hometown St. Louis Cardinals.

Playing career
Maxvill appeared in 1,423 regular-season games for the Cardinals (1962–72), Oakland Athletics (1972–73; 1974–75) and Pittsburgh Pirates (1973–74). He batted and threw right-handed. He batted .217 with six home runs in 3,989 plate appearances over his 14-year major league career.

Maxvill's best season with the bat was 1968 with the Cardinals. He set career highs in batting average (.253), on-base percentage (.329), and slugging percentage (.298). He also received his only Most Valuable Player award votes (finishing in twentieth place) and won his only Gold Glove. In the World Series that year (the last of the pre-LCS era), he went 0-for-22, the worst performance in a World Series. It was also the worst hitless streak to start a postseason until 2022. 

Maxvill holds the National League record for fewest hits for a batter playing in at least 150 games. He had 80 hits in 1970 in 399 at-bats in 152 games, just barely over the Mendoza line at .201. (The Sporting News Baseball Record, 2007, p. 19)

After batting .221 in 105 games during the first  months of the campaign, he was acquired by the Oakland Athletics from the Cardinals for minor-league third baseman Joe Lindsey on August 30, 1972. The deal occurring one day prior to the waiver trade deadline meant that he was eligible to be on the A's roster for its postseason run. Minor-league catcher Gene Dusan was also sent to the Cardinals to complete the transaction two months later on October 27.

Coaching and executive career
The 1987 season was the last time one of Maxvill's teams made the playoffs. The Cardinals finished above .500 in 1989, 1991, 1992, and 1993, but their best finish was 2nd place. Longtime owner and president August "Gussie" Busch died in September 1989 and Anheuser-Busch took over operations of the team.

Changes within the top levels in the organization continued to the point that most remnants of the Busch era turned over. The next season, longtime manager Whitey Herzog resigned and Torre was hired in his place. However, the brewery did not appear as invested as Busch in making the Cardinals a winning team and began looking to sell the team. As a result, after new president Mark Lamping was hired in 1994, he sought to make changes to attempt to build a winner. Three weeks after Lamping's hire, he fired Maxvill. The next year, Anheuser-Busch sold the team to an investment group led by Fred Hanser, Drew Baur and William DeWitt, Jr. At this point, Maxvill pursued no further baseball opportunities, citing the desire to spend more time with his family.

References

External links

Dal Maxvill at SABR (Baseball BioProject)
Dal Maxvill Oral History Interview - National Baseball Hall of Fame Digital Collection

1939 births
Atlanta Braves coaches
baseball players from Illinois
Gold Glove Award winners
Jacksonville Suns players
living people
Major League Baseball executives
Major League Baseball general managers
Major League Baseball shortstops
Major League Baseball third base coaches
New York Mets coaches
Oakland Athletics coaches
Oakland Athletics players
people from Granite City, Illinois
Pittsburgh Pirates players
St. Louis Cardinals coaches
St. Louis Cardinals executives
St. Louis Cardinals players
Washington University Bears baseball players
McKelvey School of Engineering alumni